Ostryakovsky is a rural locality (a khutor) in Lukovskoye Rural Settlement, Nekhayevsky District, Volgograd Oblast, Russia. The population was 40 as of 2010.

Geography 
Ostryakovsky is located 26 km north of Nekhayevskaya (the district's administrative centre) by road. Lukovskaya is the nearest rural locality.

References 

Rural localities in Nekhayevsky District